Munir Khan Orakzai (1959/1960 - 2 June 2020) was a Pakistani politician who had been a member of the National Assembly of Pakistan since August 2018, and Ex parliamentary leader of FATA and a senior was member of the National Assembly from 2002 to 2013.

Political career
Orakzai was elected to the National Assembly of Pakistan from Constituency NA-38 (Tribal Area-III) as an independent candidate in 2002 Pakistani general election. He received 6,619 votes and defeated an independent candidate, Gul Manan.

He was re-elected to the National Assembly from Constituency NA-38 (Tribal Area-III) as an independent candidate in 2008 Pakistani general election. He received 16,525 votes and defeated an independent candidate, Akhunzada Obaidullah Sharif.
He was the member of 18th Amendment. Due to services for the nation he received the Nishan-e-Imtiaz in 2011.

Munir khan Orakzai joined JUI F on 11th of February 2013.  Referring to the party’s recently constituted grand jirga to discuss issues faced by the tribal people, Jan said: “He (Munir) has been attending our jirga deliberations even before joining (the party). And being a prominent tribal and political personality, he is entitled to become a member of the jirga.”
. He was Jamiat Ulema-e Islam (F) (JUI-F) candidate for the seat of the National Assembly from Constituency NA-38 (Tribal Area-III) in 2013 Pakistani general election. However, an election meeting of the JUI-F was attacked which killed at least 19 people. Orakzai was the apparent target of the attack claimed by Tehrik-i-Taliban Pakistan, due to which the elections were postponed in the constituency.

He was re-elected to the National Assembly as a candidate of Muttahida Majlis-e-Amal (MMA) from Constituency NA-45 (Tribal Area-VI) in 2018 Pakistani general election. He received 16,353 votes and defeated Said Jamal, a candidate of Pakistan Tehreek-e-Insaf.

Death
He died on 2 June 2020, due to a heart attack caused by post COVID-19 complications. He had tested positive for Covid-19 in April. He was buried in his ancestral graveyard in Mandoori.

References

Muttahida Majlis-e-Amal MNAs
Pakistani MNAs 2002–2007
Pakistani MNAs 2008–2013
People from Kurram District
2020 deaths
Pakistani MNAs 2018–2023
Year of birth missing
Deaths from the COVID-19 pandemic in Punjab, Pakistan